Son Altesse Sérénissime (His Serene Highness) is a series of espionage novels created by French author Gérard de Villiers, featuring Austrian prince Malko Linge as the lead character. Since 2006, the novels have been published as comic books, though aimed chiefly at adults given their contents of violence and sex. Villiers's books have been bestsellers, making him a very wealthy man.

The novel's title is a play on initials: Son Altesse Sérénissime (SAS) is the French version of "His Serene Highness" (HSH); and the British Special Air Service (SAS) is the principal special forces unit of the British Army.

In 2014, Vintage Books posthumously published English versions  of The Madmen of Benghazi and Chaos in Kabul, translated and adapted by William Rodarmor. The publisher released three other books in English through 2016.

Background
Gérard de Villiers was a correspondent for France-Soir and other newspapers. He began writing the SAS novels in 1964, when an editor told him that Ian Fleming had died and that de Villiers might create the next James Bond. He succeeded;  the series had sold about 100 million copies worldwide, comparable to the Bond series. It may be the longest book series in history written by one person.

Government officials and intelligence officers, who enjoyed seeing themselves fictionalized and reading about events they could not publicly reveal, told de Villiers secrets that appeared in SAS, making the series' plots and settings unusually realistic. The books often predicted future events such as the capture of Carlos the Jackal, assassination of Anwar Sadat, and events in the Syrian Civil War. Robert F. Worth, former Beirut bureau chief for The New York Times, was amazed to read in La Liste Hariri details of the assassination of Rafic Hariri that no journalist knew when the book appeared. A Lebanese intelligence officer who wanted to reveal information but did not trust journalists (including Worth) helped de Villiers, the novelist said.

Hubert Védrine said that while Foreign Minister, before visiting a country he read SAS novels to learn what French intelligence believed about it. While the books' many detailed sex scenes give the series a poor literary reputation, "the French elite pretend not to read him, but they all do", Védrine said.

Plot 
In order to finance the repairs of his castle in Liezen, Austria, main character Malko Linge works as a freelance agent for the CIA of the United States. The CIA sends him on dangerous missions all over the world. He has an excellent memory and speaks several languages fluently. He is very well-groomed, preferring to wear tailor-made alpaca suits. He carries an ultra-small gun.

Recurring characters 
The following supporting characters regularly appear in the S.A.S. espionage novels:
 Samantha Adler : A German brunette and arms dealer.
 Mandy Brown aka Mandy la salope (Mandy the bitch) : An American maneater.
 Frank Capistrano : Italian American who is a special advisor to the White House.
 Elko Krisantem : Turkish servant of Malko Linge. He used to be a killer.
 Alexandra Vogel : Malko's fiancée.
 Milton Brabeck : A CIA agent who protects Malko on several missions. Partner of Chris Jones.
 Chris Jones : A CIA agent who protects Malko on several missions. Partner of Milton Brabeck.

List of novels 
 SAS à Istanbul, Plon / Presses de la Cité, 1965
 S.A.S. contre C.I.A., Plon / Presses de la Cité, 1965
 Opération Apocalypse, Plon / Presses de la Cité, 1965
 Samba pour SAS, Plon / Presses de la Cité, 1966
 Rendez-vous à San Francisco, Plon / Presses de la Cité, 1966
 Le Dossier Kennedy, Plon / Presses de la Cité, 1967
 SAS broie du noir, Plon / Presses de la Cité, 1967
 SAS aux Caraïbes, Plon / Presses de la Cité, 1967
 SAS à l'ouest de Jérusalem, Plon / Presses de la Cité, 1967
 L'Or de la rivière Kwaï, Plon / Presses de la Cité, 1968
 Magie noire à New York, Plon / Presses de la Cité, 1968
 Les Trois Veuves de Hong Kong, Plon / Presses de la Cité, 1968
 L'Abominable Sirène, Plon / Presses de la Cité, 1969
 Les Pendus de Bagdad, Plon / Presses de la Cité, 1969
 La Panthère d'Hollywood, Plon / Presses de la Cité, 1969
 Escale à Pago-Pago, Plon / Presses de la Cité, 1969
 Amok à Bali, Plon / Presses de la Cité, 1970
 Que viva Guevara, Plon / Presses de la Cité, 1970
 Cyclone à l'ONU, Plon / Presses de la Cité, 1970
 Mission à Saïgon, Plon / Presses de la Cité, 1970
 Le Bal de la comtesse Adler, Plon / Presses de la Cité, 1971
 Les Parias de Ceylan, Plon / Presses de la Cité, 1971
 Massacre à Amman, Plon / Presses de la Cité, 1971
 Requiem pour Tontons Macoutes, Plon / Presses de la Cité, 1971
 L'Homme de Kabul, Plon / Presses de la Cité, 1972
 Mort à Beyrouth, Plon / Presses de la Cité, 1972
 Safari à La Paz, Plon / Presses de la Cité, 1972
 L'Héroïne de Vientiane, Plon / Presses de la Cité, 1972
 Berlin : Check-point Charlie, Plon / Presses de la Cité, 1973
 Mourir pour Zanzibar, Plon / Presses de la Cité, 1973
 L'Ange de Montevideo, Plon / Presses de la Cité, 1973
 Murder Inc., Las Vegas, Plon / Presses de la Cité, 1973
 Rendez-vous à Boris Gleb, Plon / Presses de la Cité, 1974
 Kill Henry Kissinger !, Plon / Presses de la Cité, 1974
 Roulette cambodgienne, Plon / Presses de la Cité, 1974
 Furie à Belfast, Plon / Presses de la Cité, 1974
 Guêpier en Angola, Plon / Presses de la Cité, 1975
 Les Otages de Tokyo, Plon / Presses de la Cité, 1975
 L'ordre règne à Santiago, Plon / Presses de la Cité, 1975
 Les Sorciers du Tage, Plon / Presses de la Cité, 1975
 Embargo, Plon / Presses de la Cité, 1976
 Le Disparu de Singapour, Plon / Presses de la Cité, 1976
 Compte à rebours en Rhodésie, Plon / Presses de la Cité, 1976
 Meurtre à Athènes, Plon / Presses de la Cité, 1976
 Le Trésor du Négus, Plon / Presses de la Cité, 1977
 Protection pour Teddy Bear, Plon / Presses de la Cité, 1977
 Mission impossible en Somalie, Plon / Presses de la Cité, 1977
 Marathon à Spanish Harlem, Plon / Presses de la Cité, 1977
 Naufrage aux Seychelles, Plon / Presses de la Cité, 1978
 Le Printemps de Varsovie, Plon / Presses de la Cité, 1978
 Le Gardien d'Israël, Plon / Presses de la Cité, 1978
 Panique au Zaïre, Plon / Presses de la Cité, 1978
 Croisade à Managua, Plon / Presses de la Cité, 1979
 Voir Malte et mourir, Plon / Presses de la Cité, 1979
 Shangaï Express, Plon / Presses de la Cité, 1979
 Opération Matador, Plon / Presses de la Cité, 1979
 Duel à Barranquilla, Plon / Presses de la Cité, 1980
 Piège à Budapest, Plon / Presses de la Cité, 1980
 Carnage à Abu Dhabi, Plon / Presses de la Cité, 1980
 Terreur à San Salvador, Plon / Presses de la Cité, 1980
 Le Complot du Caïre, Plon / Presses de la Cité, 1981
 Vengeance romaine, Plon / Presses de la Cité, 1981
 Des armes pour Khartoum, Plon / Presses de la Cité, 1981
 Tornade sur Manille, Plon / Presses de la Cité, 1981
 Le Fugitif de Hambourg, Plon / Presses de la Cité, 1982
 Objectif Reagan, Plon / Presses de la Cité, 1982
 Rouge grenade, Plon / Presses de la Cité, 1982
 Commando sur Tunis, Plon / Presses de la Cité, 1982
 Le Tueur de Miami, Plon / Presses de la Cité, 1983
 La Filière bulgare, Plon / Presses de la Cité, 1983
 Aventure au Surinam, Plon / Presses de la Cité, 1983
 Embuscade à la Khyber Pass, Plon / Presses de la Cité, 1983
 Le Vol 007 ne répond plus, Plon / Presses de la Cité, 1984
 Les Fous de Baalbek, Plon / Presses de la Cité, 1984
 Les Enragés d'Amsterdam, Plon / Presses de la Cité, 1984
 Putsch à Ouagadougou, Plon / Presses de la Cité, 1984
 La Blonde de Pretoria, Plon / Presses de la Cité, 1985
 La Veuve de l'Ayatollah, Plon / Presses de la Cité, 1985
 Chasse à l'homme au Pérou, Plon / Presses de la Cité, 1985
 L'affaire Kirsanov, Plon / Presses de la Cité, 1985
 Mort à Gandhi, Plon / Presses de la Cité, 1986
 Danse macabre à Belgrade, Plon / Presses de la Cité, 1986
 Coup d'État au Yémen, Plon / Presses de la Cité, 1986
 Le Plan Nasser, Plon / Presses de la Cité, 1986
 Embrouilles à Panama, Plon / Presses de la Cité, 1987
 La Madone de Stockholm, Plon / Presses de la Cité, 1987
 L'Otage d'Oman, Plon / Presses de la Cité, 1987
 Escale à Gibraltar, Plon / Presses de la Cité, 1987
 Aventure en Sierra Leone, Éditions Gérard de Villiers, 1988
 La Taupe de Langley, Éditions Gérard de Villiers, 1988
 Les Amazones de Pyongyang, Éditions Gérard de Villiers, 1988
 Les Tueurs de Bruxelles, Éditions Gérard de Villiers, 1988
 Visa pour Cuba, Éditions Gérard de Villiers, 1989
 Arnaque à Brunei, Éditions Gérard de Villiers, 1989
 Loi martiale à Kaboul, Éditions Gérard de Villiers, 1989
 L'Inconnu de Leningrad, Éditions Gérard de Villiers, 1989
 Cauchemar en Colombie, Éditions Gérard de Villiers, 1989
 Croisade en Birmanie, Éditions Gérard de Villiers, 1990
 Mission à Moscou, Éditions Gérard de Villiers, 1990
 Les Canons de Bagdad, Éditions Gérard de Villiers, 1990
 La Piste de Brazzaville, Éditions Gérard de Villiers, 1991
 La Solution rouge, Éditions Gérard de Villiers, 1991
 La Vengeance de Saddam Hussein, Éditions Gérard de Villiers, 1991
 Manip à Zagreb, Éditions Gérard de Villiers, 1992
 KGB contre KGB, Éditions Gérard de Villiers, 1992
 Le Disparu des Canaries, Éditions Gérard de Villiers, 1992
 Alerte Plutonium, Éditions Gérard de Villiers, 1992
 Coup d'État à Tripoli, Éditions Gérard de Villiers, 1992
 Mission Sarajevo, Éditions Gérard de Villiers, 1993
 Tuez Rigoberta Menchu, Éditions Gérard de Villiers, 1993
 Au nom d'Allah, Éditions Gérard de Villiers, 1993
 Vengeance à Beyrouth, Éditions Gérard de Villiers, 1993
 Les Trompettes de Jéricho, Éditions Gérard de Villiers, 1994
 L'Or de Moscou, Éditions Gérard de Villiers, 1994
 Les Croisés de l'Apartheid, Éditions Gérard de Villiers, 1994
 La Traque Carlos, Éditions Gérard de Villiers, 1994
 Tuerie à Marrakech, Éditions Gérard de Villiers, 1995
 L'Otage du triangle d'or, Éditions Gérard de Villiers, 1995
 Le Cartel de Sébastopol, Éditions Gérard de Villiers, 1995
 Ramenez-moi la tête d'El Coyote, Éditions Gérard de Villiers, 1995
 La Résolution 687, Éditions Gérard de Villiers, 1996
 Opération Lucifer, Éditions Gérard de Villiers, 1996
 Vengeance tchétchène, Éditions Gérard de Villiers, 1996
 Tu tueras ton prochain, Éditions Gérard de Villiers, 1996
 Vengez le vol 800, Éditions Gérard de Villiers, 1997
 Une lettre pour la Maison-Blanche, Éditions Gérard de Villiers, 1997
 Hong Kong express, Éditions Gérard de Villiers, 1997
 Zaïre adieu, Éditions Gérard de Villiers, 1997
 La Manipulation Yggdrasil, Éditions Malko productions, 1998
 Mortelle Jamaïque, Éditions Malko productions, 1998
 La Peste noire de Bagdad, Éditions Malko productions, 1998
 L'Espion du Vatican, Éditions Malko productions, 1998
 Albanie, mission impossible, Éditions Malko productions, 1999
 La Source Yahalom, Éditions Malko productions, 1999
 Contre P.K.K., Éditions Malko productions, 1999
 Bombes sur Belgrade, Éditions Malko productions, 1999
 La Piste du Kremlin, Éditions Malko productions, 2000
 L'Amour fou du Colonel Chang, Éditions Malko productions, 2000
 Djihad, Éditions Malko productions, 2000
 Enquête sur un génocide, Éditions Malko productions, 2000
 L'Otage de Jolo, Éditions Gérard de Villiers, 2001
 Tuez le Pape, Éditions Gérard de Villiers, 2001
 Armageddon, Éditions Gérard de Villiers, 2001
 Li Sha-Tin doit mourir, Éditions Gérard de Villiers, 2001
 Le Roi fou du Népal, Éditions Gérard de Villiers, 2002
 Le Sabre de Bin Laden, Éditions Gérard de Villiers, 2002
 La Manip du Karin A, Éditions Gérard de Villiers, 2002
 Bin Laden, la traque, Éditions Gérard de Villiers, 2002
 Le Parrain du 17 novembre, Éditions Gérard de Villiers, 2003
 Bagdad-Express, Éditions Gérard de Villiers, 2003
 L'Or d'Al-Qaida, Éditions Gérard de Villiers, 2003
 Pacte avec le diable, Éditions Gérard de Villiers, 2003
 Ramenez les vivants, Éditions Gérard de Villiers, 2004
 Le Réseau Istanbul, Éditions Gérard de Villiers, 2004
 Le Jour de la Tcheka, Éditions Gérard de Villiers, 2004
 La Connexion saoudienne, Éditions Gérard de Villiers, 2004
 Otages en Irak, Éditions Gérard de Villiers, 2005
 Tuez Iouchtchenko, Éditions Gérard de Villiers, 2005
 Mission : Cuba, Éditions Gérard de Villiers, 2005
 Aurore noire, Éditions Gérard de Villiers, 2005
 Le Programme 111, Éditions Gérard de Villiers, 2006
 Que la bête meure, Éditions Gérard de Villiers, 2006
 Le Trésor de Saddam : 1, Éditions Gérard de Villiers, 2006
 Le Trésor de Saddam : 2, Éditions Gérard de Villiers, 2006
 Le Dossier K, Éditions Gérard de Villiers, 2006
 Rouge Liban, Éditions Gérard de Villiers, 2007
 Polonium 210, Éditions Gérard de Villiers, 2007
 Le Défecteur de Pyongyang : 1, Éditions Gérard de Villiers, 2007
 Le Défecteur de Pyongyang : 2, Éditions Gérard de Villiers, 2007
 Otage des Taliban, Éditions Gérard de Villiers, 2007
 L'Agenda Kosovo, Éditions Gérard de Villiers, 2008
 Retour à Shangri-La, Éditions Gérard de Villiers, 2008
 Al-Qaïda attaque : 1, Éditions Gérard de Villiers, 2008
 Al-Qaïda attaque : 2, Éditions Gérard de Villiers, 2008
 Tuez le Dalaï-Lama, Éditions Gérard de Villiers, 2008
 Le Printemps de Tbilissi, Éditions Gérard de Villiers, 2009
 Pirates, Éditions Gérard de Villiers, 2009
 La Bataille des S-300 : 1, Éditions Gérard de Villiers, 2009
 La Bataille des S-300 : 2, Éditions Gérard de Villiers, 2009
 Le Piège de Bangkok, Éditions Gérard de Villiers, 2009
 La Liste Hariri, Éditions Gérard de Villiers, 2010
 La Filière suisse, Éditions Gérard de Villiers, 2010
 Renegade : 1, Éditions Gérard de Villiers, 2010
 Renegade : 2, Éditions Gérard de Villiers, 2010
 Féroce Guinée, Éditions Gérard de Villiers, 2010
 Le Maître des hirondelles, Éditions Gérard de Villiers, 2011
 Bienvenue à Nouakchott, Éditions Gérard de Villiers, 2011
 Rouge Dragon : 1, Éditions Gérard de Villiers, 2011
 Rouge Dragon : 2, Éditions Gérard de Villiers, 2011
 Ciudad Juárez, Éditions Gérard de Villiers, 2011
 Les Fous de Benghazi, Éditions Gérard de Villiers, 2012
 Igla S, Éditions Gérard de Villiers, 2012
 Le Chemin de Damas : 1, Éditions Gérard de Villiers, 2012
 Le Chemin de Damas : 2, Éditions Gérard de Villiers, 2012
 Panique à Bamako, Éditions Gérard de Villiers, 2012
 Le Beau Danube rouge, Éditions Gérard de Villiers, 2013
 Les fantômes de Lockerbie, Éditions Gérard de Villiers, 2013
 Sauve-qui-peut à Kaboul : 1, Éditions Gérard de Villiers, 2013
 Sauve-qui-peut à Kaboul : 2, Éditions Gérard de Villiers, 2013
 La Vengeance du Kremlin, Éditions Gérard de Villiers, 2013

Movies 
Some books have been turned into movies.
 S.A.S. à San Salvador (1982) (IMDB) starring Miles O'Keeffe as Malko. Based on the novel S.A.S. à San Salvador.
 Eye of the Widow (1989) (IMDB) starring Richard Young as Malko. Based on the books Vengeance Romaine and La veuve de l'ayatollah.

References

External links 
The home of Editions Gérard de Villiers

Series of books
Fictional secret agents and spies
Fictional Central Intelligence Agency personnel
Fiction books about the Central Intelligence Agency
French film series
Characters in pulp fiction